Conde de Lipa Ludwik Tarszeński Konarzenski, known as Conde de Lipa (Count of Lipa) (ca.1793 – October 24, 1871) was a Polish captain and photographer recognized for his participation in the November Uprising in Poland, and for his work as an early photographer and one of the first instructors of photography with his own photo schools in Spain. He was official photographer to the Queens of Spain and Portugal. Spanish poet and publisher Enrique Hernández-Luike was his great-grandson.

Biography
Ludwik Tarszeński was born (according to his death certificate), in Lupko, province of Podlasc, Poland (possibly Łupków, Podkarpakie, Poland) in 1793 or 1794, son of Benedicto Tarszeński Grande de Polonia and Tecla Konarcenski. He became a captain in the Polish army. In 1830, he formed part of the November Uprising against the Russian Czar Nicholas I of Russia, led by Piotr Wysocki

Along with thousands of émigrés, Tarszeński moved to France after the failed uprising.

By 1843 he lived in Seville (Sevilla), where he defended the city and Queen Isabel II from a siege by Antonio Wan-Halen, capturing two spies. That same year, he was named Knight of the Order of Isabel la Católica. The following year, he married Magdalena de Voisins in the Parish of San Vicente, Sevilla. In 1847 he moved to Málaga, where he opened the first daguerrotype studio of the city. It's likely that the Count of Lipa photographed the Duke of Montpensier during his visit to Málaga in 1849. He taught photography in Málaga, as he did in Sevilla, selling the latest photographic equipment imported from France. Many photographers in Spain learned from him, including Juan Antonio Ibáñez Martínez (b. 1812 Yecla, Murcia) and Amalia L. de López, the first professional female photographer in Spain (Jaen), and author of one of the portraits of Conde de Lipa  preserved.

The Conde de Lipa was very involved in literary circles, and was the official photographer to both the Queen of Spain, Isabel II, and the Queen of Portugal, Maria II. In 1857, Pedro Antonio de Alarcón dedicates his novel '"¡Viva el Papa!" to Luis Farszeñski, Conde de Lipa. In 1861, he participated in one of the many literary circles in Seville, with the reading of the ode "To Poland". The following year he gave "an elegant moire and satin album, with several photographs of the Holy Face" to Queen Isabel II, with the occasion of her visit to Jaén.

By 1866 the Conde de Lipa was definitively the official photographer to Queen Isabel II, photographing the act of laying the first stone of the National Library of Spain in Madrid (Biblioteca Nacional de España en Madrid), on April 22, 1866 . He later offered these photos for sale in his studio. The newspaper La Iberia speaks of “the magnificent museum the photographer Count of Lipa has in Atocha street, number 18 (Madrid)″. The article also mentions the photographs he had taken of the collection of the Real Armería; however the photos preserved in the Spanish National Library of the Armería are labeled with Jean Laurent's company, which leads historians to believe Lipa's photographs ended in Laurent's collection.

By 1868 he may have moved to Zafra, Badajoz. In November 1867, he took the oldest image that is preserved of Cáceres, of the inauguration of the works of the City Council. The next year he took the first picture of Jesus Nazareno of Cáceres. On October 24, 1871, "Luis Tarszensky y Konarzensky, conde de Lipa, native of Lupko, Podlasc province (Poland)", died in Zafra, Badajoz, at the age of 77 years, of chronic colitis. He was buried in the cemetery there. He was survived by his wife Magdalena, his daughter Enriqueta, who married Manuel Hernández, of Zafra, and by his son Luis Tarszenski de Lipa y Voisins, who moved to Havana, Cuba, to teach Natural Sciences.

Controversy in the Polish exiled community
In 1831, "Podczaszyński went to Metz, Konstanty Zaleski to Strasbourg and Ludwik Tarszeński to Valenciennes, with instructions to establish contact with the Polish community and provide information on the needs of the émigrés, and to help plan their trip to Paris or elsewhere”. On May 23, 1837, Captain Tarszeński wrote an open letter from Bourdeaux to his compatriots in exile, declaring himself not guilty of the charges against him in connection with their activities in Galicia, Poland, in 1833. Walery Wieloglowski, politician (1805–1865), responded in a public statement to Ludwik Tarszeński's challenge to a duel, saying he would not accept the challenge until “people who have made accusations against Tarszeński retract” those allegations, and then the exile community will recognize Tarszeński as an honorable man.
Although Ludwik Tarszenski resided in Spain, he still publicly stood for the cause of a free Poland, reading the ode "To Poland" in a literary circle in Sevilla, in 1861. In 1866, he requested that the Minister of Development of Spain create “a project of colonization of certain areas of Spain for the interests of our agriculture and wealth of our soil, to make Spain a second home for the children of the hapless Poland who have to get away from their home for the duration of the circumstances that weigh on it today“. More research is needed on this subject.

The Origin of his Heraldic Title of Nobility
According to family history, Ludwik Tarszeński received his title of Count of Lipa (Conde de Lipa) from Louis Philippe I, King of France, after he photographed the collection of the Louvre Museum (between 1837 and 1842). Ludwik's father, Benedicto Tarszeński, held the title "Grande de Polonia". The family Tarszeński belongs to the Lubicz noble clan of Poland, and bears that heraldic coat of arms. More research is needed on this subject.

Selected works
 Portrait of Conde de Lipa by Amalia Lopez 
 Gallery of photographs by Conde de Lipa

See also
 November Uprising
 Louis Daguerre
 Jean Laurent
 Charles Clifford
 Enrique Hernández-Luike

References

External links 
 Exhibition Ciudades en Construcción
 Conde de Lipa 

Photographers from Seville
1871 deaths
1790s births
Polish emigrants to Spain